"Trojans", evoking the soldiers of the ancient city of Troy depicted in The Iliad, is a popular name for modern sports teams, including those listed here.

Non-scholastic teams 
 Rotterdam Trojans (est. 1984), the American Football Club representing the city of Rotterdam (Netherlands) in the AFBN
 Trojans Rugby Club, Stoneham Lane, Eastleigh, Hampshire
 Trojans F.C., an amateur football club based in Derry, Northern Ireland
 Halifax Trojan Aquatic Club, a swim team out of Halifax, N.S., Canada.
 Trojan (Racing team) of the British manufacturer of Trojan cars
 Belfast Trojans, American Football team representing Belfast in the Irish American Football League (IAFL)
 Troy Trojans (MLB team), Major League Baseball team from Troy, New York in the National League from 1879 to 1882
 Trojans Korfball Club, a korfball team based in Croydon, Surrey, England
 Turku Trojans, American Football team based in Turku, Finland

College teams 
Trojans, the sports teams representing Southern Institute of Technology (SAIT) college in Calgary, AB

University teams 
 USC Trojans, the sports teams representing University of Southern California
  The Trevecca (TNU) Trojans, the sports teams representing Trevecca Nazarene University, an NCAA-Division II university located in Nashville, TN
  The Troy Trojans, the sports teams representing Troy University (formerly Troy State University)
 Arkansas–Little Rock Trojans, the sports teams representing The University of Arkansas at Little Rock
  SAIT Trojans, the athletic organization representing the Southern Alberta Institute of Technology
  Trojans, the sports teams representing Virginia State University in Petersburg, VA
  Trojans, the sports teams representing University of Mount Olive an NCAA-Division II in Mount Olive, NC
  Trojans, the sports teams representing Dakota State University, an NAIA school in Madison, SD
  Trojans, the sports teams representing Trinity International University an NAIA school in Deerfield, IL
 Valley Forge Military College, The Trojans, Wayne PA
 Trojans, the mascot of Taylor University, an NAIA school in Upland, Indiana.

High school teams 

 All Saints Episcopal School, Tyler, Texas
 Anderson High School, Austin, Texas
 Andover High School, Andover, Kansas
 Arcanum Local School,  Arcanum, Ohio
 Auburn High School, Auburn, Illinois
  Bandys High School, Catawba, North Carolina
  Botkins High School, Botkins, Ohio
  St. Thomas Aquinas High School, Edison, New Jersey
 The Bromfield School, Harvard, Massachusetts
  Bruce High School, Bruce, Mississippi
 California High School, California, Pennsylvania
 Carrollton High School, Carrollton, Georgia
 Cary-Grove High School, Cary, Illinois
 Castle Park High School, Chula Vista, California
 Castro Valley High School, Castro Valley, California
 Center Grove High School, Greenwood, Indiana
 Central High School (Traverse City, Michigan)
 Central Lake High School, Central Lake, Michigan
 Chesterton High School, Chesterton, Indiana
 Chase High School, Forest City, North Carolina
 Clarenceville School District
 Clawson High School, Clawson, Michigan
 Coalhurst High School, Coalhurst, Alberta
 Collinwood High School, Collinwood, Tennessee
 Cumby High School, Cumby, Texas
 Daphne High School, Daphne, Alabama
 Derry Area High School, Derry, Pennsylvania
 Downers Grove North High School, Downers Grove, Illinois
 Durham High School, Durham, California
 Dyersburg High School, Dyersburg, Tennessee
 East Lansing High School, East Lansing, Michigan
 Fairfield High School, Fairfield, Iowa
 Fife High School, Tacoma, Washington
  Forest Park High School, Crystal Falls, Michigan
 Foothill High School, Bakersfield, CA
 Gaithersburg High School, Gaithersburg, Maryland
 Garden City High School, Garden City, New York
 Garner Magnet High School, Garner, North Carolina 
 Gaylesville High School, Gaylesville, Alabama
 Glen Este High School, Cincinnati, Ohio
 Gordon Lee High School, Chickamauga, Georgia
 Greater Johnstown High School, Johnstown, Pennsylvania
  Hampshire High school, Romney, West Virginia
 Hillsboro High School, Hillsboro, Kansas
 Homedale High School, Homedale, Idaho
 Hot Springs High School, Hot Springs, Arkansas
 Jean Ribault Senior High School (Florida), Jacksonville, Florida
  James Island High School, Charleston, South Carolina
 Jenks High School, Jenks, Oklahoma
  Jones Senior High School, Trenton, North Carolina
  J. P. Taravella High School, Coral Springs, Florida
 Kiefer High School, Kiefer, Oklahoma
 Lake City High School, Lake City, Michigan
 Lake Worth Community High School, Lake Worth, Florida
 Lassiter High School, Marietta, Georgia
 Las Animas High School (Las Animas, Colorado)
 Lely High School, Naples, Florida
 Lincoln High School (Tallahassee, Florida)
 Lincoln High School (Stockton, California)
 Longmont High School, Longmont, Colorado
 Manlius Pebble Hill School, Syracuse, New York
 Maroa-Forsyth High School, Maroa, Illinois
 Mayfield High School, Las Cruces, New Mexico
 Maynard Evans High School, Orlando, Florida
  Meridian High School, Bellingham, Washington
 McDowell High School, Erie, Pennsylvania
 Millington Central High School, Millington, Tennessee
  Michael Power/St Joseph High School, Toronto, Ontario
  Milpitas High School, Milpitas, California
  Morgan High School, Morgan, Utah
 Morristown-Hamblen High School West, Morristown, Tennessee
 Monroe High School, Monroe, Michigan
 Nampa Christian High School, Nampa, Idaho
 New Castle High School, New Castle, Indiana
 Newcomerstown High School, Newcomerstown, Ohio
 Newman Smith High School, Carrollton, Texas
 North Catholic High School, Pittsburgh, Pennsylvania
 North Hardin High School, Radcliff, Kentucky
 Northwestern High School, Rock Hill, South Carolina
 Olympic High School, Charlotte, North Carolina
 Olympic High School, Silverdale, Washington
 Orland High School, Orland, California
 Ortonville High School, Ortonville, Minnesota
  Pahrump Valley High School, Pahrump, Nevada
  Paradise Valley High School, Phoenix, Arizona
 Park Hill High School, Kansas City, Missouri
  Peach County High School, Fort Valley, Georgia
 Petaluma High School, Petaluma, California
  Pine Forest High School, Fayetteville, North Carolina
 Portsmouth High School, Portsmouth, Ohio
 Post Falls High School, Post Falls, Idaho
  Potosi High School, Potosi, Missouri
  Preston High School, Preston, Iowa
  Rigby High School, Rigby, Idaho
 Romig Middle School, Anchorage, Alaska
 Saginaw High School in Saginaw, Michigan
 Simsbury High School in Simsbury, Connecticut
 South Houston High School in South Houston, Texas
  South Johnston High School, Four Oaks, North Carolina
  Southeastern High School, South Charleston, Ohio
 Southern High School, Louisville, Kentucky
  Stanton County High School, Johnson, Kansas
 Subiaco Academy, Subiaco, Arkansas 
 Southwestern High School (New York)
 Terra Linda High School, San Rafael, California
 Thornapple Kellogg High School, (Middleville, Michigan)
 Topeka High School, Topeka, Kansas
 Tremper High School, Kenosha, Wisconsin
 Trinity High School (Euless, Texas)
 Trinity High School (Garfield Heights, Ohio)
 Troy Area Junior Senior High School, Troy, Pennsylvania
 Troy High School (Troy, Ohio)
 Tunstall High School, Dry Fork, Pittsylvania County, Virginia
  Turkey Valley Community School, Jackson Junction, Iowa
 Turner Fenton Secondary School, Brampton, Ontario
 Tuscarawas Valley High School, Zoarville, Ohio
 University High School, Waco, Texas
 University High School, Irvine, California.
 Vincent Massey Collegiate Winnipeg, Manitoba
 Wood Memorial Junior and Senior High School, Oakland City, Indiana
 Walsingham Academy, Williamsburg, Virginia
 Wayzata High School, Plymouth, Minnesota
 Wendell High School, Wendell, Idaho
  West High School, West, Texas
  West Seneca East Senior High School, West Seneca, New York
 Whitmore Lake Secondary School, Whitmore Lake, Michigan
 Windthorst High School, Windthorst, Texas
 Wissahickon High School, Ambler, Pennsylvania
 Zama American High School, Camp Zama, Japan (APO San Francisco CA 96343)

Sports teams named Trojans
Lists of sports teams
Nicknames in sports
Sports culture
Athletic culture based on Greek antiquity